Natalie Claire Dodd (born 22 November 1992, in Hamilton) is a New Zealand cricketer who has represented New Zealand in women's one-day internationals. She made her international debut in 2010 as a teenager in year 12 at Waikato Diocesan School.

Career
A prolific top order batsman, Dodd started playing cricket when she was around 10 and quickly developed her skills and made her first rep side at age 11 when selected for the Northern Districts under-14 team. She now is a teacher and spent some years teaching at Te Kowhai school in the Waikato. She currently works at Korakonui School as she has done since 2016.

After more than a decade with Northern Spirit, in July 2018 Dodd switched to the Central Hinds to reinvigorate her career. She ended the 2018/19 season as the Central Hinds' top run-scorer, with the first title of her long domestic career, having helped the team win the one-day Hallyburton Johnstone Shield.

In March 2019, she was named as the Women's Domestic Player of the Year and the recipient of the Ruth Martin Cup for batting at the annual New Zealand Cricket awards. In June 2020, Dodd was awarded with a central contract by New Zealand Cricket ahead of the 2020–21 season.

References

External links

1992 births
Living people
Cricketers from Hamilton, New Zealand
New Zealand women cricketers
New Zealand women One Day International cricketers
New Zealand women Twenty20 International cricketers
Northern Districts women cricketers
Central Districts Hinds cricketers